The Ranger 30 is an American sailboat, that was designed by C. Raymond Hunt Associates and first built in 1977.

Production
The boat was built by Ranger Yachts in the United States, starting in 1977, but is now out of production.

Design
The Ranger 30 is a recreational keelboat, built predominantly of fiberglass, with wood trim. It has a masthead sloop rig, an internally-mounted spade-type rudder and a fixed fin keel. It displaces  and carries  of ballast.

The boat is fitted with a Universal Atomic 4 gasoline engine.

The boat has a PHRF racing average handicap of 174 with a high of 185 and low of 168.

See also
List of sailing boat types

References

Keelboats
1970s sailboat type designs
Sailing yachts
Sailboat type designs by C. Raymond Hunt Associates
Sailboat types built by Ranger Yachts